Anderson University is a private Christian university in Anderson, Indiana. It is affiliated with the Church of God. The university offers more than 60 undergraduate majors as well as graduate programs in business, music, and theology.

History

Anderson University was established in 1917 as the Anderson Bible Training School by the Church of God (Anderson, Indiana) movement. The school was a major step in the life of a fellowship of Christians that originated in 1881. The young school moved rapidly to develop a wider general education program, changed its name to Anderson College and Theological Seminary, then Anderson College, and finally, Anderson University.

President

Organization
Anderson University has grown to include an undergraduate liberal arts program, organized into six schools and graduate programs in theology, music, and business.

Schools

Falls School of Business
School of Humanities and Behavioral Science
School of Music, Theatre, and Dance
School of Nursing and Kinesiology
School of Theology and Christian Ministry
School of Science & Engineering

Academics 
The university offers more than 60 majors.

Graduate programs
School of Theology
Master of Theological Studies
Master of Divinity
Master of Arts in Christian Ministry
 Falls School of Business
Master of Business Administration
Doctorate of Business Administration
 Education
Master of Music Education

Funding
Anderson University is a private institution, receiving funds from tuition, fees, research grants (including funds from the Lilly Endowment and the Indiana Department of Environmental Management), private scholarship funds, and alumni contributions. The university's endowment was $20.8 million as of FY06.

Campus

Featured facilities on the campus include the Reardon Auditorium and the Kardatzke Wellness Center.  Athletic facilities on the campus include Macholtz Stadium and the O. C. Lewis Gymnasium.

Academic buildings

Byrum Hall
Decker Hall
Hartung Hall
Krannert Hall
Hardacre Hall
Reardon Auditorium
Nicholson Library - Campus library
Kardatzke Wellness Center
Kissinger Academic Center for Excellence
York Performance Hall

Athletic facilities

Bennett Natatorium (men's/women's swimming and diving)
Don Brandon Field (baseball)
Esports lab (esports)
Kardatzke Wellness Center (indoor track and field)
Macholtz Stadium (football, men's/women's lacrosse, track and field)
O.C. Lewis Gymnasium (men's/women's basketball, volleyball)
Raven Field (softball)
Scott Fridley Field (men's/women's soccer)
Tennis Courts (men's/women's tennis)

Service buildings
Health Services
Hardacre Hall (Physical Plant and Police/Security)
Morrison House (Counseling Services and Campus Ministries)

Indianapolis Colts Training Camp
The Indianapolis Colts of the NFL held their training camp at Anderson University from 1984 to 1998.  After an 11-year stint at Rose-Hulman Institute of Technology, the Colts elected to return to Anderson, Indiana to renew their familiar partnership with the local university from 2010 to 2016.

Student activities
Anderson University student activities are coordinated by the Student Life staff, the Campus Activities Board, and the Student Government Association.

Chapel services
Required chapel/convocation attendance for students is an Anderson University tradition, maintained throughout the entire history of the university. Students are currently required to attend 18 chapels per semester to fulfill the undergraduate requirement.

Persons from the campus community gather regularly for chapel/convocation services. Speakers include campus personalities and guests. Students regularly participate in music and worship leadership with all events coordinated by the school's campus pastor.

Honor societies
Anderson University has several honor societies. They are as the following:

Alpha Chi
Alpha Lambda Delta
Collegiate National Association for Music Education
Phi Eta Sigma
Alpha Mu Gamma
Alpha Sigma Lambda
Delta Mu Delta
Delta Sigma Rho-Tau Kappa Alpha
Enactus
Engineering
History
Kappa Delta Pi
Kappa Mu Epsilon
Model UN
Phi Alpha
Phi Alpha Theta
Phi Alpha Theta XI
Phi Epsilon Kappa
Pi Kappa Lambda
Pi Sigma Alpha
Pre-Professional Health Society
Public Relations Student Society of America
Psi Chi
Serving Others with Kindness
Sigma Tau Delta
Sigma Theta Tau
Sigma Zeta National Science and Math Honor Society
AU Student Accounting Society

Clubs and organizations
Anderson University has over 100 organizations for fine arts, athletics, academics, and special interests/hobbies.

AU Chorale
AU Community Garden
AU Symphonic Orchestra 
AU Dance Team
AU Relay for Life
Beyond Haiti
Bound
College Mentor for Kids
College Republicans
Concert Band
Enactus
Engineering Club
FCA
Jazz Ensemble
Lacrosse
Men's Volleyball
Model UN
New Image Gospel Choir
Operation Foundation
Rugby
Student United Way
Swim Club
Swing Club
Ultimate Frisbee
AU Men's Chorus "Vox Corvi"
AU Women's Chorus "Vola Voce"
Wind Ensemble

Social clubs
The university allows student-run social clubs that are similar to other campus's fraternities and sororities, which put on annual events and service projects. Current social clubs include:

Alacritas (Women)
Avanti Boosters (Men)
Delta Kappa Alpha or "Dativus" (Men)
Kappa Sigma Tau or "Adelphi" (Men)
Delta Gamma Kappa or "Leona" (Women)
Phi Kappa Alpha (Men)
Phi Lambda Sigma or "Camarada" (Women)
Novus Dux (Men) No longer active

Campus ministries
Campus Ministries seeks to foster intentional Christian discipleship and spiritual growth in order to help students experience Christ as the living center of their life. This life of faithfulness involves communion with Christ, community with each other and ministry to the world.
Big Buddies/Little Buddies
The Christian Center
Differently-Abled
Generation to Generation
Juvenile Justice
Prayer Ministry
Student Peace Initiative [SPI]
Study Buddies
VisionRevision

Athletics

The Anderson Ravens compete in athletics in the NCAA Division III and the Heartland Collegiate Athletic Conference. Men's sports offered at Anderson University include football, basketball, baseball, lacrosse, tennis, golf, soccer, cross country, swimming, and track & field. Women's sports offered at Anderson University include basketball, softball, lacrosse, tennis, volleyball, soccer, golf, cross country, swimming, and track & field. Anderson University also offers Men's Volleyball, Rugby, and Men's Lacrosse as club sports.
Formerly the Tigers, AU's nickname was changed to the Ravens in 1937. The current mascot is Rodney the Raven.

Hall of Fame
The Anderson University Athletic Hall of Fame was started in 1997 with 10 inductees that year. Ten additional honorees were added in 1998. Members have been inducted each year. The names are nominees are submitted and given consideration by the Hall of Fame committee. The committee has 11 representatives and is headed by university's Athletic Director. The inductees are announced each Spring and formally inducted into the Hall of Fame at a banquet during the university's homecoming activities each Fall.

Two Anderson coaches have been inducted to the National Association of Intercollegiate Athletics (NAIA) Hall of Fame; tennis coach Bob Blume in 1978, and baseball coach Carl Erskine in 1989.

Sports medicine
Students and professors of the athletic training program work with Anderson University athletes.

Intramurals
BestColleges.com voted Anderson University as one of the country's top 25 colleges for intramurals sports.

Fall Season
Flag Football
Ultimate Frisbee
Spikeball
Wiffleball
Volleyball
Team Handball
KanJam
Floor Hockey
Spring Season
Basketball
Indoor Soccer
Pool Volleyball	
Corn Hole
Softball
Outdoor Soccer	
Badminton

See also

List of Anderson University (Indiana) alumni

References

External links
 

 
Universities and colleges affiliated with the Church of God (Anderson, Indiana)
Liberal arts colleges in Indiana
Buildings and structures in Anderson, Indiana
Educational institutions established in 1917
Tourist attractions in Anderson, Indiana
Education in Madison County, Indiana
Evangelicalism in Indiana
Council for Christian Colleges and Universities
1917 establishments in Indiana
Private universities and colleges in Indiana